Niznik Island is an island in the north part of George VI Sound, lying opposite the mouth of Eureka Glacier near the coast of Palmer Land. Discovered by the Ronne Antarctic Research Expedition (RARE), 1947–48, under Ronne, who named it for the Theodore T. Niznik family of Baltimore, MD, contributors to the expedition. Niznik Island is part of the George VI Ice Shelf.

See also 
 List of Antarctic and sub-Antarctic islands

Islands of Palmer Land